San Cristóbal is a city in the center-north of the , 179 km north-northwest from the provincial capital.

The town was founded in 1890 and the attained the status of comuna (commune) on 1894-01-21. It became a city on 1959-03-01.

References
 Municipality of San Cristóbal - Official website.
 
 

Populated places in Santa Fe Province